The 1928 Washington Huskies football team was an American football team that represented the University of Washington during the 1928 college football season. In its eighth season under head coach Enoch Bagshaw, the team compiled a 7–4 record, finished in eighth place in the Pacific Coast Conference, and outscored all opponents by a combined total of 188 to 74. Clarence Dicks was the team captain.

Schedule

References

Washington
Washington Huskies football seasons
Washington Huskies football